FLB may refer to:
 Brandenburg Football Association
 Breton Liberation Front, a paramilitary group in France
 Faint little ball, a Drosophila gene
 Faulconbridge railway station, in New South Wales, Australia
 Favourite-longshot bias, in gambling and economics
 Federal Land Bank, part of the United States Farm Credit System
 Flashlight Brown, a Canadian punk rock band
 Fly Linhas Aéreas, a defunct Brazilian airline
 Frihetliga Ljusdalsbygden, a Swedish political party
 General Aviation FLB, an American aircraft
 Lebanese Basketball Federation (French: Fédération Libanaise de Basketball)
 Stade Francis-Le Blé, a stadium in Brest, France